Jasenica is a village and municipality in Považská Bystrica District in the Trenčín Region of north-western Slovakia.

History
In historical records the village was first mentioned in 1269.

Geography
Jasenica is lying in Považie region in Papradno valley among four hills Hradište, Dúbrava, Súdna and Lopušná. Across this valley flows river called Papradnianka. The municipality lies at an altitude of 311 metres and covers an area of 7.298 km². It has a population of about 1030 peoples.

Religion
In village is Roman Catholic parish of St. Michael Archangel where two next village belong: Stupné and Podvažie. Parish church is Church of St. Michael Archangel in Jasenica.

Genealogical resources

The records for genealogical research are available at the state archive "Statny Archiv in Bytca, Slovakia"

 Roman Catholic church records (births/marriages/deaths): 1717-1895 (parish A)

See also
 List of municipalities and towns in Slovakia

References

External links

 
 http://travelingluck.com/Europe/Slovakia/Slovakia+(general)/_3059703_Jasenica.html#themap - Maps of Jasenica, weather in Jasenica, sunrise and sunset in Jasenica
https://web.archive.org/web/20071027094149/http://www.statistics.sk/mosmis/eng/run.html
http://www.travelsradiate.com/europe/slovak-republic/Jasenica/3059703-Jasenica.html
Surnames of living people in Jasenica

Villages and municipalities in Považská Bystrica District